Louis Takaji Julien Thébault Yamaguchi, also known as Louis Yamaguchi (born 28 May 1998) is a Japanese-French footballer who plays as a goalkeeper for J2 League club Mito HollyHock.

Club career
Born in La Garenne-Colombes, Paris to a French father and a Japanese mother, Yamaguchi moved to Tokyo at six months old, and returned to France at the age of 16, joining FC Lorient's youth setup. On 16 June 2017, after finishing his formation, he moved to Spanish Segunda División B side Extremadura UD, being initially assigned to the reserves.

Yamaguchi made his senior debut on 3 September 2017, starting in a 1–0 Tercera División home loss against UD Montijo. He became a regular starter for the B-side during the following seasons, and ahead of the 2019–20 campaign, he was definitely promoted to the first team as a backup to Casto.

Yamaguchi made his professional debut on 3 November 2019, starting in a 3–1 home loss against Girona FC in the Segunda División. He left the club in the following July, as his contract expired, and joined Recreativo de Huelva in the third division on 11 August.

After leaving Recreativo in July 2021, Yamaguchi signed with J2 League club Mito HollyHock in January 2022. He made his club debut in a 2-1 loss to Thespakusatsu Gunma as the team's starting goalkeeper, replacing Shu Mogi.

International career
Yamaguchi represented Japan at under-19, under-20 and under-23 levels. He was a member of the Japanese squad at the 2017 FIFA U-20 World Cup, and the squad that finished runners-up in the 2019 Toulon Tournament.

References

External links

1998 births
Living people
People from La Garenne-Colombes
Japanese people of French descent
French people of Japanese descent
Japanese footballers
French footballers
Association football goalkeepers
FC Tokyo players
FC Lorient players
Segunda División players
Segunda División B players
Tercera División players
Extremadura UD B players
Extremadura UD footballers
Recreativo de Huelva players
Mito HollyHock players
French expatriate footballers
Japanese expatriate footballers
French expatriate sportspeople in Spain
Japanese expatriate sportspeople in Spain
Expatriate footballers in Spain
Japan youth international footballers
Japan under-20 international footballers